The Democratic Union was a liberal-left-wing political alliance in Israel formed between Meretz, Israel Democratic Party, Labor defector Stav Shaffir, and the Green Movement that ran in the September 2019 Israeli legislative election. On 19 December 2019, Labor defector Stav Shaffir and her party, the Green Movement, announced a press conference in which she would leave the alliance to run independently in the 2020 Israeli legislative election. The Democratic Union initially announced on 7 January 2020 that it will run in the 2020 election, this time including Meretz and Democratic Choice.

On 13 January 2020, it was announced that a new Labor-Gesher-Meretz slate had been formed for the 2020 election, excluding Shaffir, but including Yair Golan in a reserved Meretz slot.

History
A meeting was held between Ehud Barak and Issawi Frej (with Stav Shaffir "mediating") on 24 July to make various agreements between their respective factions, with Barak allowing Meretz leader Nitzan Horowitz first place on the list, as well as Barak being placed in tenth place on the list, but with "first pick of portfolios" if the alliance goes into government. The Meretz party voted on 28 July to approve the agreement regarding the Democratic Union.

The agreement binds the parties to not join a coalition with a right-wing government, declaring: "We will not lend our hand to a right-wing government headed by Netanyahu, and not a right-wing government headed by the puppets of Netanyahu in any situation, in any scenario, in any way." The parties also pledge to "defend the democratic character of the state, with an emphasis on the Supreme Court, to abolish the Nation-state Law, and to promote peace and a political settlement with the Palestinian Arabs".

Composition

Former members

Former MKs
The Democratic Union had five members in the 22nd Knesset.

 Meretz,  Israel Democratic,  Green Movement

Election results

References

2019 establishments in Israel
2020 disestablishments in Israel
Political parties disestablished in 2020
Political parties established in 2019
Defunct political party alliances in Israel
Social democratic parties in Israel
Zionist political parties in Israel
Meretz